The 1994 Men's Hockey Champions Trophy was the 16th edition of the Hockey Champions Trophy men's field hockey tournament.

Results

Pool

Classification

Fifth and sixth place

Third and fourth place

Final

Final standings

References

External links
Official FIH website

Q
C
Champions Trophy (field hockey)
1992